is the upcoming 24th studio album by Japanese singer-songwriter Mari Hamada, to be released by Victor Entertainment on April 19, 2023. The album coincides with Hamada's 40th anniversary in the music industry. It features a roster of guest musicians, including Loudness guitarist Akira Takasaki, Symphony X guitarist Michael Romeo, Act of Defiance guitarist Chris Broderick, veteran session guitarist Michael Landau, Mr. Big bassist Billy Sheehan, Steve Vai bassist Philip Bynoe, veteran session bassist Leland Sklar, veteran keyboardist Jeff Bova, Planet X keyboardist Derek Sherinian, and violinist Lili Haydn. The album will be released in two editions: a single CD and a limited edition two CD + DVD set. The lead track "Tomorrow Never Dies" was released on streaming platforms on March 3, 2023.

Track listing

Personnel 
 Michael Landau – guitar
 Akira Takasaki – guitar
 Michael Romeo – guitar, keyboards
 Chris Broderick – guitar
 Takashi Masuzaki – guitar
 ISAO – guitar
 Leland Sklar – bass
 Billy Sheehan – bass
 Philip Bynoe – bass
 BOH – bass
 Jeff Bova – keyboards
 Derek Sherinian – keyboards
 Masafumi Nakao – keyboards
 Gregg Bissonette – drums
 Marco Minnemann – drums
 Hideki Harasawa – drums
 Lili Haydn – violin
 Saori Hoshino – violin

References

External links 
  (Mari Hamada)
  (Victor Entertainment)

2023 albums
Japanese-language albums
Mari Hamada albums
Victor Entertainment albums